The music director of The Tabernacle Choir at Temple Square is responsible for musical and creative supervision of the Tabernacle Choir at Temple Square, the Orchestra at Temple Square, the Temple Square Chorale, and the Bells on Temple Square, which are all official musical organizations within the Church of Jesus Christ of Latter-day Saints (LDS Church). Part of a group of 85 Welsh converts that immigrated in 1849, John Parry was invited by Brigham Young to organize a choir for the church's next general conference.

Directors

Works cited
 Porcaro, Mark David. Secularization of the Repertoire of the Mormon Tabernacle Choir, 1949-1992. University of North Carolina, 2006
 Pyper, George D. Stories of Latter Day Saint Hymns Their Authors and Composers. Kessinger Publishing, 2004.

References

 
Tabernacle Choir at Temple Square music directors
Tabernacle Choir music directors